Giovanni Cervone (born 16 November 1962 in Brusciano) is an Italian former professional footballer who played as a goalkeeper. He is now the goalkeeping coach for the Lebanese National Football Team.

Honours
Roma
 Coppa Italia winner: 1990–91.

External links

1962 births
Living people
Italian footballers
Association football goalkeepers
Serie A players
Serie B players
S.S. Juve Stabia players
U.S. Avellino 1912 players
U.S. Catanzaro 1929 players
Genoa C.F.C. players
Parma Calcio 1913 players
Hellas Verona F.C. players
A.S. Roma players
Brescia Calcio players
Ravenna F.C. players